The Tauernkogel (also Felber Tauernkogel) is a mountain, in the Venediger Group of Austria's High Tauern. It lies west of the Felber Tauern and the border between the states of Salzburg and Tyrol runs over the summit. It may be climbed on a difficult mountain tour via a steep snowfield in about 1.½ hours from the St. Pöltner Hut.

References

Sources 
Österreichische Karte (ÖK) des Bundesamtes für Eich- und Vermessungswesen (BEV).
Alpine Club map: Venedigergruppe, German Alpine Club.

Mountains of the Alps
Two-thousanders of Austria
Venediger Group